Manuel Portilla Diéguez (born 10 September 1969) is a Mexican politician from the Ecologist Green Party of Mexico. From 2007 to 2009 he served as Deputy of the LX Legislature of the Mexican Congress representing the State of Mexico.

References

1969 births
Living people
Politicians from Mexico City
Ecologist Green Party of Mexico politicians
21st-century Mexican politicians
Members of the Congress of the State of Mexico
Deputies of the LX Legislature of Mexico
Members of the Chamber of Deputies (Mexico) for the State of Mexico